Case is an unincorporated community in Warren County, in the U.S. state of Missouri.

History
Case had its start in the 1890s when the railroad was extended to that point.  A post office called Case was established in 1893, and remained in operation until 1946. The community most likely has the name of a railroad promoter.

References

Unincorporated communities in Warren County, Missouri
Unincorporated communities in Missouri